Flight of the Navigator is a 1986 American science fiction adventure film directed by Randal Kleiser and written by Mark H. Baker, Michael Burton, and Matt MacManus. It stars Joey Cramer as David Freeman, a 12-year-old boy who is abducted by an alien spaceship and transported from 1978 to 1986. It features an early film appearance by Sarah Jessica Parker as Carolyn McAdams, a key character who befriends David in a time of need.

The film's producers initially sent the project to Walt Disney Pictures in 1984, but the studio was unable to approve it and it was sent to Producers Sales Organization, which made a deal with Disney to distribute it in the United States. It was partially shot in Fort Lauderdale, Florida, and Norway, being a coproduction with Norwegian company Viking Film.

The film is notable for being one of the first Hollywood films to use extensive CGI effects.  Specifically, it was the first use of image-based lighting, and an early use of morphing in a motion picture. It is also known to be one of the first Hollywood productions to feature an entirely electronic music film score, composed using a Synclavier, one of the first digital multi-track recorders and samplers.

The film has since become a cult classic and has a large cult following among science fiction and Disney fans. In September 2017, Walt Disney Pictures announced that a reboot of it is in the works.

Plot 
On July 4, 1978, in Fort Lauderdale, Florida, 12-year-old David Freeman walks through the woods to pick up his 8-year-old brother, Jeff, from a friend's house when he falls into a ravine and is knocked unconscious. When he comes to, eight years have passed and it is now 1986. He has not aged, and his appearance exactly matches his missing child poster. He is reunited with his aged parents and the now 16-year-old Jeff.

Meanwhile, an alien spaceship crashes through power lines and is captured by NASA. Hospital tests on David's brainwaves reveal images of it. Dr. Louis Faraday, who has been studying it, persuades David to come to a NASA research facility for just 48 hours, promising him they can help learn what happened to him. Dr. Faraday discovers that his mind is full of alien technical manuals and star charts far exceeding NASA's research, and that he was taken to the planet Phaelon, 560 light years away, in just 2.2 hours (approx. 2,105,990.4 x c). Having travelled faster than light, he has experienced time dilation, explaining how eight years have passed on Earth, but not for him. Dr. Faraday decides to keep him there to finish his investigation, breaking his 48-hour promise.

Following a telepathic communication from the spaceship, David secretly boards it and meets its robotic commander, "Trimaxion Drone Ship" ("Max"), who calls him the "Navigator". They escape from the facility and Max tells David that his mission is to travel the galaxy collecting biological specimens for analysis on Phaelon before returning them to their homes. Phaelon's scientists discovered that humans only use 10% of their brain and, as an experiment, filled the remainder of David's with miscellaneous information. Max returned him to Earth, but not to his own time, having determined a trip back in time would be dangerous for a human. When Max crashed the spaceship, the computer's data was erased. So he needs the information in David's brain to return home.

While Max prepares for a mind transfer, David meets other alien specimens on board and bonds with a "Puckmaren", a tiny bat-like creature that is the last of his kind after a comet destroyed his planet. During the mind transfer, Max contracts human emotions and behaves eccentrically. His and David's bickering trigger UFO reports in Tokyo and the United States. Meanwhile, NASA intern Carolyn McAdams, who befriended David, tells his family about his escape in the spaceship, so Dr. Faraday has them confined to their house, and Carolyn is sent back to the facility.

When the spaceship stops at a gas station, David calls Jeff, who sets off fireworks on the roof to locate their new house. David and Max arrive there, but NASA agents have tracked the spaceship. Fearing institutionalization if he remains in 1986, David orders Max to return him to 1978, accepting the risk of vaporization. He awakes in the ravine, walks home, and finds everything as he left it. During the Fourth of July celebration, Jeff sees that the Puckmaren has stowed away in David's backpack. David tells him to keep it a secret, while Max flies home across the firework-lit sky, calling, "See you later, navigator!"

Cast 
 Joey Cramer as David Freeman (12 Years Old)
 Paul Reubens as Voice of Max
 Veronica Cartwright as Helen Freeman
 Cliff DeYoung as Bill Freeman
 Sarah Jessica Parker as Carolyn McAdams
 Matt Adler as Jeff Freeman (16 Years Old)
 Albie Whitaker as Jeff Freeman (8 Years Old)
 Howard Hesseman as Dr. Louis Faraday
 Jonathan Sanger as Dr. Carr
 Iris Acker as Janet Howard
 Richard Liberty as Larry Howard
 Raymond Forchion as Detective Banks
 Keri Rogers as Jennifer Bradley

Casting

The filmmakers held auditions for the role of David Freeman. Several actors auditioned for it, including Joaquin Phoenix and Chris O'Donnell.

Production 
Some of the scenes with the Trimaxion Drone Ship were rendered in computer-generated imagery (CGI) by Omnibus Computer Animation, under the supervision of director Randal Kleiser's brother, Jeff. It was the first film to use reflection mapping to create realistic reflections on a simulated chrome surface.

Jeff Kleiser explained that Randal had been inspired by commercial work that he had done at his previous company, Digital Effects: "Jean Miller and Bob Hoffman had written a reflection mapping software that simulated a drop of water dripping from a faucet, which had refraction and reflection on the spout and it drips off. Randal saw that: ‘Wow. Could you make the spaceship reflective, like reflecting the environment?’" The morphing effect was based on by work Digital Effects had done on a 1985 Tide detergent commercial.

Effects were rendered on the Foonly F1 computer before being matted onto the film print. The computer did not have much storage space so once the frame was mapped the data was deleted to make way for the new frame. The rest were using one of two life size props or miniatures on a computer operated camera.

Soundtrack 
The music score for the film was composed and performed by Alan Silvestri. It is distinct from his other scores in being entirely electronically generated, using the Synclavier, one of the first digital multi-track recorders and samplers.

 Theme from "Flight of the Navigator"
 "Main Title"
 "The Ship Beckons"
 "David in the Woods"
 "Robot Romp"
 "Transporting the Ship"
 "Ship Drop"
 "Have to Help a Friend"
 "The Shadow Universe"
 "Flight"
 "Finale"
 "Star Dancing"

Critical reception 
The film received mainly positive reviews. Rotten Tomatoes gave it a rating of 84% based on 31 reviews, with an average rating of 6.60/10. The consensus reads, "Bolstered by impressive special effects and a charming performance from its young star, Flight of the Navigator holds up as a solidly entertaining bit of family-friendly sci-fi."

Kevin Thomas of the Los Angeles Times said the film's biggest plus was "its entirely believable, normal American family." The New York Times described it as "definitely a film most children can enjoy." People declared it "out-of-this-world fun." Empire gave it 3/5 stars, saying it was "well-made enough to keep the family happy, but it certainly won’t challenge them." Variety was more critical, announcing that "instead of creating an eye-opening panorama, Flight of the Navigator looks through the small end of the telescope." Dave Kehr gave it 3 stars and described it as "a new high for Disney."

Special effects analysis
In May 2021, independent filmmaker Alan Melikdjanian released a nostalgic documentary about the film, explaining the various types of visual effects utilized to create the alien spaceship.

Remake 
In May 2009, The Hollywood Reporter reported that Disney was readying a remake of the film. Brad Copeland was writing the script and Mandeville partners David Hoberman and Todd Lieberman would serve as producers. In November 2012, Disney hired Safety Not Guaranteeds director Colin Trevorrow and writer/producer Derek Connolly to rewrite the script.

In September 2017, Walt Disney Pictures announced that a reboot of the film is in pre-production with Joe Henderson from TV's Lucifer writing the script. Shortly after the Lionsgate/Henson announcement, in November at the same year, Neill Blomkamp tweeted that Oats Studios has begun developing a reboot as its first feature film.

In September 2021, it was announced that the remake was back in development with Bryce Dallas Howard set to direct and will feature a female protagonist. It will be released on Disney+.

Notes and references

External links 
 
 
 
 
 
 

1980s science fiction adventure films
1986 films
American children's adventure films
American children's fantasy films
American robot films
American science fantasy films
American science fiction adventure films
Fiction about intergalactic travel
Films about NASA
Films about time travel
Films directed by Randal Kleiser
Puppet films
Films scored by Alan Silvestri
Films set in 1978
Films set in 1986
Films set in Florida
Films shot in Florida
Films shot in Norway
Films set in Tokyo
Films set on spacecraft
Fort Lauderdale, Florida
Independence Day (United States) films
Walt Disney Pictures films
1980s English-language films
1980s American films